Pink TV is an adult-themed television company that exclusively features pornographic content. Founded in 1998, Pink TV is based in Miami, Florida. Pink TV is currently available as a paysite on the internet as well as a "hidden" channel on Roku. The company produces its own content, including several adult-themed series, pornographic movies, clips and "behind the scenes" shows. The paysite also features live video streams, a free 24-hour broadcast of their Pink TV Channel, and chat interaction with live nude women.

References

External links
 pinktv.com

American pornographic television channels
Companies based in Miami
Pornography in Florida
Nudity in television
Television pornography